Sobredoxis is the third studio album of the reggaeton duo Jowell & Randy. It was released on June 4, 2013. Originally, it was to be titled El Momento 2, but after a meeting with record labels, it was decided to change the name. The album includes collaborations with Daddy Yankee, Arcángel, 3Ball MTY, De La Ghetto, Farruko, Tony Tun Tun and Divino. It debuted at number ten on the Latin Albums chart and number one on the Latin Rhythm Albums chart.

Track listing 
 Sobredoxis
 Báilalo a Lo Loco (feat. 3Ball MTY)
 Las Nenas Lindas
 Living In Your World
 Mucha Soltura (feat. Daddy Yankee)
 Tú Eres Mala
 Acomódate (feat. Arcángel & De La Ghetto)
 Prendan Los Motores (feat. Farruko)
 Isla Del Encanto
 ¿Cómo Hago? (feat. Divino)
 Lo Que Te Gusta (feat. Tony Tun Tun)
 Sobredoxis de Amor
 Ragga-Dub

Chart performance

References 

Jowell & Randy albums
2013 albums